is a Japanese manga series by Yagura Asano about table tennis. It began serialization in Shueisha's shōnen manga magazine Jump SQ.19 in 2013. After Jump SQ.19 ended publication in February 2015, the manga moved to Shueisha's online platform Tonari no Young Jump in May 2015, and finished in February 2019. It has been collected in seven tankōbon volumes. An anime television series adaptation by Kinema Citrus aired in Japan between October and December 2016. A sequel manga series, Scorching Ping Pong Girls Reburn!!, will begin serialization from April 2023.

Characters

Suzumegahara Municipal Junior High

A shy transfer student who joins Suzumegahara's table tennis club. She loves table tennis and was a prefectural semifinalist in her previous school.

A second year in the table tennis club and the ace prior to Koyori joining the club.

A second year table tennis club member who is classmates with Koyori and Agari. She is an energetic girl who possesses an offensive playstyle involving fast returns.

A second year table tennis club member who is friends with Hanabi. She generally uses a calculative playstyle, allowing her to manipulate how her opponents hit the ball, and can guess what type of underwear someone is wearing from their paddle. Her family runs a table tennis specialist store.

A third year and the vice-captain of the table tennis club. Nicknamed  due to her ample breasts.

A third year and the captain of the table tennis club. She generally uses a playstyle that involves a backspin chop that forces her opponent to make errors when returning shots, and enjoys imposing penalties on her clubmates during practice.

Mozuyama Junior High

A third year and the vice-captain of the table tennis club. She's the ace of the club, and along with Zakuro, lead their team to the Nationals. She has a pension for using the word "death" when speaking, and has a crush on Zakuro. She uses a playstyle that involves a curve drive that forces her opponents to return shots that miss the table and turn to the left.

A third year and captain of the table tennis club. She started playing after witnessing Kururi defeating all of the seniors in their team and became inspired to play like her. She has a tendency to be clumsy and act like a klutz when speaking.

A second year table tennis club member who sees herself as the future captain but feel underappreciated by her teammates. She uses an off-rhythm playstyle that throws her opponents off from their usual playstyle.

A second year table tennis club member who's nicknamed , due to her playstyle of forcing her opponents into rallies that drain their stamina and predicting what shots they'll deliver.

A second year table tennis club member who is friends with Kimiko.

A second year table tennis club member who is friends with Kanenashi. Nicknamed  due to her constant chowing down of food in her mouth.

Tsumebame Girl's Academy

A second year who was formerly part of Suzemegahara's table tennis club, before transferring to Tsumebame after being enticed by their captain. On the day she left, Agari asked her to play one match with her before leaving but refused. She has a talent for ventriloquism that involves talking with her hairpin she calls Kumanosuke.

Media

Manga
Scorching Ping Pong Girls, written and illustrated by Yagura Asano, began its serialization in the 2013 11th issue of Shueisha's Jump SQ.19 on December 19, 2013. After Jump SQ.19 ceased its publication on February 19, 2015, the series was switched to the Tonari no Young Jump online platform starting on May 15, 2015. The original run ended on February 1, 2019. Shueisha compiled its chapters into seven tankōbon volumes, published between March 4, 2015 and April 4, 2016. On February 24, 2023, a one-shot manga titled  was released on Takeshobo's Storia website, which announced that the original manga would be returning for a second season titled Scorching Ping Pong Girls Reburn!!, which will begin serialization from April 28, 2023.

Volume list

Anime
An anime television adaptation of the series was announced in March 2016. The anime is produced by Kinema Citrus, directed by Yasuhiro Irie and written by Hideyuki Kurata, featuring character designs by Junko Sugimura and music by MONACA. The series aired on TV Tokyo between October 3, 2016 and December 19, 2016 and was simulcast by Crunchyroll. The anime will be released across six Blu-ray & DVD volumes.

Episode list

Reception
Anime News Network had four editors review the first episode of the anime: Theron Martin said that despite the bland production, workmanlike animation and typical moe designs, he commended the show's writing for its charming humor and moe elements, and leaving enough room for character development between its two main leads; Nick Creamer was initially unimpressed by the show's aesthetics in the opening scenes and described it as "meaningless club activities plus clumsy fanservice", but was hooked by the conflict between Agari and Koyori's differing viewpoints on playing table tennis and its adequate delivery of a sports narrative; Paul Jensen found the series conflicted with its jumbling of both school comedy and sports elements and preferred that it went with the latter genre to focus on both table tennis and the Agari-Koyori relationship. The fourth reviewer, Rebecca Silverman, criticized the art direction and character designs for being generic and annoyingly simplistic, and the animation of the ping pong scenes for lacking excitement for the viewers. Silverman added that the series has potential by putting its focus more on both the explanation of ping pong and Agari's conundrum of wanting to excel at the sport while wanting to have friends, concluding with, "So right now this episode stands with as a big question – will it learn to balance its elements? Will the sports drama win out, or will the moe? I'm not sure it's worth finding out."

Notes

References

External links
 

2013 webcomic debuts
Anime series based on manga
Hideyuki Kurata
Japanese webcomics
Kinema Citrus
Seinen manga
Shōnen manga
Shueisha manga
Table tennis in anime and manga
Takeshobo manga
TV Tokyo original programming
Webcomics in print